Francis Rei Paul Hamon  (17 December 1919 – 16 August 2008) was a New Zealand landscape artist. In 1976, his lithograph Jewels of Okarito was presented to Queen Elizabeth II by the New Zealand Government on the occasion of a state visit.

Hamon was born in 1919 the son of a white mother and a part-Maori father and grew up in Gisborne, New Zealand.

Career
Utilizing a self-taught style of pointillism, Hamon's familiarity with the flora and fauna of the bush grew from the time that he worked splitting posts for sheep pens in the forests of the Urewera area.

Hamon was appointed a Commander of the Order of the British Empire, for services to art, in the 1981 New Year Honours. In 2010, a documentary on Hamon premiered, Rei Hamon: Man of Nature.

Personal life
Hamon was the oldest of fourteen children and the father of fourteen more. Hamon was a member of the Church of Jesus Christ of Latter-day Saints (LDS Church).

See also
Chuck Close
Henri-Edmond Cross

References

Further reading
 Rei Hamon, Artist of the New Zealand Bush, p. 164.
 Rei Hamon, "Jewels of Okarito," printed by The Thames Star Co., Ltd., Thames, New Zealand.

External links
James C. Christensen Greenwich Workshop Biography

1919 births
2008 deaths
New Zealand Commanders of the Order of the British Empire
Latter Day Saint artists
New Zealand artists
Ngāi Tāmanuhiri people
New Zealand Latter Day Saints
People from Gisborne, New Zealand